Neoregelia cyanea is a plant species in the genus Neoregelia. This species is endemic to Brazil.

Cultivars 
 Neoregelia 'Angel Dust'
 Neoregelia 'Blue Angel'
 Neoregelia 'Born of Fire'
 Neoregelia 'Bromlust'
 Neoregelia 'Burgundy Angel'
 Neoregelia 'Candance'
 Neoregelia 'Carleen Isley'
 Neoregelia 'Golden Glow'
 Neoregelia 'Golden Grace'
 Neoregelia 'Golden Jewels'
 Neoregelia 'Lavender Frost'
 Neoregelia 'Little Devil'
 Neoregelia 'Louie'
 Neoregelia 'Nick Espinosa'
 Neoregelia 'Peggy B.'
 Neoregelia 'Pinkie'
 Neoregelia 'Short And Sweet'
 Neoregelia 'Sugar and Spice'
 Neoregelia 'Sun Lover'
 Neoregelia 'Sunny Delight'
 Neoregelia 'Sweet Nellie'
 Neoregelia 'Twinkie'

References

BSI Cultivar Registry Retrieved 11 October 2009

cyanea
Flora of Brazil